Buyeo Yung (615–682) was the eldest son of King Uija, the last king of Baekje.  He was appointed crown prince in 644, and would have been the kingdom's 32nd ruler. He is known as the progenitor of Buyeo Seo Clan (부여 서씨/扶餘徐氏) where he changed his surname to Seo.

After his father was overthrown by an alliance of Silla and the Chinese Tang Dynasty in 660, Buyeo Yung was sent into exile at the Tang capital Luoyang, along with his father.  After the defeat of the Baekje restoration movement led by Boksin and Dochim at the Battle of Baekgang, which had sought to place Yung's brother Buyeo Pung on the throne, Tang felt the need for a ruler who could pacify the Baekje area.  Beginning in 664, Buyeo Yung served briefly as the governor of the Ungjin Commandery (Hangul:웅진도독부 Hanja:熊津都督府) which Tang established to oversee the former territory of Baekje.

After Silla expelled Tang forces from the Korean peninsula in 676, Buyeo Yung returned to Luoyang, where he spent the rest of his days.

Popular culture
 Portrayed by Gong Jung-hwan in the 2012–2013 KBS1 TV series The King's Dream.

See also
History of Korea
Three Kingdoms of Korea

External links 
 Ungjin Commandery

Tang dynasty nonimperial princes
615 births
682 deaths
Baekje rulers